Eileen L. Cody (born January 5, 1954) is an American politician of the Democratic Party. She is a member of the Washington House of Representatives, representing the 34th Legislative District.

References

External links
 Eileen Cody at ballotpedia.org
 

Democratic Party members of the Washington House of Representatives
Living people
Women state legislators in Washington (state)
1954 births
People from Jefferson, Iowa
21st-century American politicians
21st-century American women politicians